Janet Berliner, formerly Janet Gluckman (September 24, 1939 – October 24, 2012), was a Bram Stoker Award-winning author and served as president of the Horror Writers Association from 1997 to 1998. She was also a member of Authors Guild, the International Thriller Writers, and the Science Fiction and Fantasy Writers of America.  She was born in Cape Town, South Africa, but moved to America with her husband in 1960.  She became a citizen of the United States in 1966, and lived in Las Vegas.

Bibliography

Series
Madagascar Manifesto
Child of the Light (1991)
Child of the Journey (1996)
Children of the Dusk (1997) – Bram Stoker Award winner
The Madagascar Manifesto (omnibus) (2002) (with George Guthridge)

Novels
Rite of the Dragon (1981) (writing as Janet Gluckman)
Artifact (2003) (with Kevin J. Anderson, Matthew J. Costello and F. Paul Wilson)

Short stories
 A Case for Justice (1998) (collected in Harry Turtledove's anthology Alternate Generals)

Essays
 Mi Yagid Labanim (1996) (Published in Johnathan Blacke and Robert Hatch's roleplaying supplement Charnel Houses of Europe: The Shoah)

References

External links
BerlinerPhiles
Bibliography
Janet Berliner's Backstory
Deep Blue Interview
Storytellers Unplugged

20th-century American novelists
21st-century American novelists
American horror writers
American women short story writers
American women novelists
1939 births
2012 deaths
Writers from Cape Town
South African emigrants to the United States
Women horror writers
20th-century American women writers
21st-century American women writers
20th-century American short story writers
21st-century American short story writers